Fissile Peak, formerly known as Red Mountain, is a mountain peak located on the eastern side of Cheakamus Lake southeast of Whistler in Garibaldi Provincial Park of British Columbia, Canada. The mountain is composed of red slate which is easily divided into thin sheets of uniform thickness; in geological terms this feature is known as fissility.


Climate
Based on the Köppen climate classification, Fissile Peak is located in the marine west coast climate zone of western North America. Most weather fronts originate in the Pacific Ocean, and travel east toward the Coast Mountains where they are forced upward by the range (Orographic lift), causing them to drop their moisture in the form of rain or snowfall. As a result, the Coast Mountains experience high precipitation, especially during the winter months in the form of snowfall. Winter temperatures can drop below −20 °C with wind chill factors below −30 °C. The months July through September offer the most favorable weather for climbing Fissile Peak.

See also

 Geography of British Columbia
 Geology of British Columbia
 Mount Price
 Overlord Mountain

Gallery

References

External links
 Weather: Mountain Forecast

Garibaldi Ranges
Two-thousanders of British Columbia
Pacific Ranges